Valmeyer Community Unit School District 3 is a unified school district centered on the Monroe County Mississippi River village of Valmeyer, Illinois, although it also encompasses residents of the villages of Fults and Maeystown. This south Illinois school district is composed of three schools: Valmeyer Elementary School, which accommodates the grades PK-5; Valmeyer Junior High School, which accommodates grades 6–8; and, lastly, Valmeyer High School, which covers grades 9–12. The mascot of the school is the pirate.

Valmeyer Community Unit School District 3 hosts a variety of afterschool activities, including National Honor Society, Model United Nations, Art Club, Spanish Club, FFA, FEA, Pep Club, pep band, a chorus and concert band..

References

External links
 

Education in Monroe County, Illinois
School districts in Illinois
Education in the Metro East